Rafael Nadal was the defending champion, but chose not to participate this year.

Dominic Thiem won the title, defeating Philipp Kohlschreiber in the final, 6–7(2–7), 6–4, 6–4.

Seeds
The top four seeds receive a bye into the second round.

Draw

Finals

Top half

Bottom half

Qualifying

Seeds

Qualifiers

Qualifying draw

First qualifier

Second qualifier

Third qualifier

Fourth qualifier

References

External links
 Main draw
 Qualifying draw

Stuttgart Open Singles
Singles 2016